Lectionary 143, designated by siglum ℓ 143 (in the Gregory-Aland numbering) is a Greek manuscript of the New Testament, on parchment leaves. Palaeographically it has been assigned to the 8th-century.

Description 
The codex contains Lessons Gospels lectionary for the Sunday and feasts with numerous lacunae.
It contains texts of Matthew 2:1-11; Luke 12:8-12; and John 20:30f.

The text is written in Greek uncial letters, on 4 parchment leaves (32 by 26 cm), in one column per page, 15 lines per page.

It was described by J. Leopoldt in 1903 along with Uncial 0164.

Currently the codex is located in: 
 Berlin State Museums, P. 8771 (Frg);
 National Library of France, Copt. 129,19 fol. 73;
 Vatican Library, Borg. copt. 109 (Cass. 23, Fasc. 97), 2 fol.

The manuscript is not cited in the critical editions of the Greek New Testament (UBS3, UBS4).

See also 

 List of New Testament lectionaries
 Coptic versions of the Bible
 Biblical manuscript
 Textual criticism

Notes and references

Bibliography 

 J. Leipoldt, Aegyptische Urkunden aus der königlichen Museen zu Berlin 1 (Berlin, 1904), pp. 147–148.

Greek New Testament lectionaries
8th-century biblical manuscripts
Greek-Coptic diglot manuscripts of the New Testament
Bibliothèque nationale de France collections